The Suburbs are an alternative punk rock/funk/new wave band from Minneapolis, Minnesota that was popular in the late 1970s and 1980s. The band frequently headlined at Minneapolis's most influential music clubs, including Jay's Longhorn Bar and First Avenue.

Band history 
The Suburbs were formed in the western suburbs of Minneapolis in November 1977 following introductions by Chris Osgood of the Suicide Commandos. Following live performances, they released The Suburbs on the Twin/Tone label (the label's first release) in early 1978. The record was a nine-song 7-inch red vinyl EP. The band also saw two songs, "Urban Guerrillas" and "Ailerons O.K.", included on the compilation Big Hits of Mid-America, Volume Three. Guitarist Bruce C. Allen did the art direction for the compilation.

After building a following playing basement parties, the Suburbs had their first major success at influential Minneapolis punk/New Wave nexus Jay's Longhorn Bar; drummer Hugo Klaers said that after getting regular gigs at the venue, "we went from nobodies to this super popular band. It was just crazy. The Longhorn shows were always packed." One notable audience member at the Suburbs' shows was Bruce Springsteen, then on tour supporting his album The River, who was so impressed with the band that he nearly joined them on stage for an encore. 
The band's popularity increased during the early to mid-1980s, and during this time, their new wave dance sound, eclectic lyrics, and stage presence gained a following that broke out of the Midwest and reached both coasts. In 1980 Twin/Tone released their first full-length LP, In Combo.

The single "World War III" (and its B-side, "Change Agent") showed development of the band's songwriting abilities and improved sound. A year later, they released the double album Credit In Heaven which added elements of jazz, funk, and disco to the mix. The single "Music for Boys" was taken from the record and became a radio hit.

In 1982, the band released the 12-inch single "Waiting", which frequently found its way onto dance club playlists. The EP Dream Hog followed on Twin/Tone, featuring three new songs and a remix of "Waiting" on the B-side, all produced by Steven Greenberg of Funkytown and Lipps Inc fame.

Greenberg then brought the Suburbs to the attention of Phonogram Inc. in 1983. Phonogram started by re-issuing Dream Hog on the Mercury label. Keyboardist/vocalist Chan Poling commented, "We love what Twin/Tone did for us, but we've always wanted to sell records, to join the big time, and you just can't do that on a little label." By this time, the band's live performances were muscular and funky, attracting rabid fans and keeping the band busy as an opening act for the likes of Iggy Pop and The B-52's, as well as headliners in their own right. They often went on stage wearing matching dinner jackets. In 1983 Polygram released Love is the Law, a harder-rocking album that included a horn section and some of their most off-beat lyrics, also produced by Steven Greenberg. In 1986, The Suburbs signed with A&M Records and released The Suburbs, produced by Prince's Revolution drummer Bobby Z. (credited as Robert Brent). Frustrated by a lack of radio play and abandoned by the major labels, the band broke up in 1987.

In 1992 Twin/Tone released Ladies and Gentlemen, The Suburbs Have Left the Building, a best-of compilation, and in 1994 a live record Viva! Suburbs!. The Suburbs reunited during this period and played numerous shows in the Twin Cities, and have played on and off since that time including opening once more for the B-52's in 2003.

Summer of 2002 saw the re-issues of the albums In Combo, Credit In Heaven and Love Is The Law on CD on the band's own Beejtar Records. In late 2003, the band issued Chemistry Set: The Songs Of The Suburbs 1977 - 1987 (a best of CD with a few bonus tracks and a DVD of their 2002 performances at Minneapolis' First Avenue).

In 2004, Chan Poling formed The New Standards with John Munson and Steve Roehm, performing some of rearranged melodies of the classic Suburbs songs in the live set including "Love Is The Law".

On December 7, 2009, guitarist Bruce Allen died aged 54.

On November 19, 2013 Si Sauvage, the band's first new release in 27 years, was released. Si Sauvage features founding members Poling, Hugo Klaers, and Blaine John “Beej” Chaney, plus new bandmates Steve Brantseg and Steve Price and special guest vocalists like Janey Winterbauer and Aby Wolf.

On August 26, 2014, the Suburbs announced that founding member Beej Chaney was taking a temporary leave of absence.

2018 has the band slated for several outdoor concerts: The Brewery Bash in Luverne, MN & Down By The Riverside Concert Series in Rochester, MN plus a show scheduled for (the landmark venue) First Avenue in Minneapolis.

2019 the band continues to be led by original members Chan Poling & drummer Hugo Klaers plus longtime sax player Max Ray (also of The Wallets). They are augmented by current members Stevie Bransteg and Jeremy Ylvisaker on guitars, Steve Prince on bass, Janey Winterbauer on backup vocals, Rochelle Becker on baritone saxophone, and Steven Kung on horns and keyboards. The band continued its live performances featuring new material plus classic Suburb songs, some of which are rearranged melodies that are toned down from the 1980s era (of the bands live shows).

The band has been honored with a star on the outside mural of the Minneapolis nightclub First Avenue, recognizing performers that have played sold-out shows or have otherwise demonstrated a major contribution to the culture at the iconic venue. Receiving a star "might be the most prestigious public honor an artist can receive in Minneapolis," according to journalist Steve Marsh.

In July 2021, the band had the honor of reopening First Avenue, which had closed during the COVID pandemic, by playing two sold-out shows at the 7th Street Entry to celebrate the release of their new album, Poets Party.

Members

Current Lineup (2014-Present)

Chan Poling: Keyboards, Vocals
Hugo Klaers: Drums, Vocals
Max Ray: Saxophone
Steve Brantseg: Guitar
Jeremy Ylvisaker: Guitar
Steve Price: Bass
Janey Winterbauer: Backing Vocals
Rochelle Becker: Baritone Saxophone
Stephen Kung: Horns, Keyboards

Classic Lineup (1977-1987, 1992-2009)

Chan Poling: Keyboards, Vocals
Bruce C. Allen (died December 7, 2009): Guitar, Vocals
Blaine John "Beej" Chaney (retired 2014): Guitar (Beejtar), Vocals
Michael Halliday (retired 2009): Bass
Hugo Klaers: Drums, Vocals

Discography

Albums
In Combo (Twin/Tone 1980)
Credit in Heaven (Twin/Tone 1981)
Love Is The Law (Mercury/Universal1984)
Suburbs (A&M/Interscope 1986)
Si Sauvage (August 27, 2013)
Hey Muse! (2017)
Poets Party (2021)

EPs
The Suburbs EP (Twin/Tone 1978)
Dream Hog EP (Twin/Tone 1982)

Compilations and live albums
Ladies and Gentlemen, The Suburbs Have Left The Building (Twin/Tone 1992)
Viva! Suburbs! Live at First Avenue (Twin/Tone 1994)
Chemistry Set: Songs of the Suburbs 1977–1987 (Beejtar/Universal 2003) (Best Of CD & Live DVD)
High Fidelity Boys - Live 1979 (Garage D'or 2006)

Singles
"World War III" (Twin/Tone 1979)
"Music for Boys" (Twin/Tone 1982)
"Waiting" (Twin/Tone 1982)
"Love Is The Law" (Mercury/Universal 1984)
"Rattle My Bones" (Mercury/Universal 1984)
"Life Is Like" (A&M 1986)
"#9" (A&M 1986)
"Heart Of Gold" (A&M 1986)
"Little Man's Gonna Fall" (Buy Records 1987)
"Turn the Radio On" (2013)

Music Videos
"Love Is The Law"
"Music For Boys"
"Tape Your Wife To The Ceiling"
"Cows"
"Waiting"
"#9"

Awards 
 The Suburbs were voted among the "100 Most Influential Minnesota Musical Entities of the Twentieth Century" by The Minneapolis Star Tribune.
 Chan Poling was voted #6 in Rake Magazine's "Favorite Minnesota Rockers" poll (alongside Prince, Bob Dylan, and Paul Westerberg).
 The Minnesota Music Awards honored Chan Poling with their POP (Perpetually Outstanding Performer) Award.

Media 
 In 1993, the song "Love is the Law" was featured during Darlene's prom dance scene during the season 5 episode "Promises, Promises" of the sitcom Roseanne.
 "Rattle My Bones" was featured in a television ad for Target, and is also played during Minnesota Vikings home games.

Bibliography 
Jon Bream (January 27, 2002). Suburban sprawl: Musical adventurer Chan Poling makes his first solo pop CD. Star Tribune.  Archived version at Chan Poling's website.
(September 25, 2002). The Suburbs: At Long Last, the 'Burbs Return to the Cities. Pulse of the Twin Cities.
(January 27, 2002). The Suburbs/Chan Poling discography. Minneapolis Star Tribune.
Minneapolis Music Collection: Band Histories. Minnesota Historical Society.
(July 12, 2011). Chan Poling talks '80s Nostalgia, the New Standards, and the possibility of a new album. Citypages

References

External links 
Twin/Tone Records: The Suburbs
The Suburbs Band Site

Punk rock groups from Minnesota
American new wave musical groups
Musical groups from the Twin Cities
Musical groups from Minnesota
Musical groups established in 1977
Musical groups disestablished in 1987
Musical groups reestablished in 1992